is a Japanese actor and model, known for playing Ryuga Banjou in Kamen Rider Build. He is represented by Tristone Entertainment.

Early life and family 
Due to his father's work, Eiji lived in Wisconsin (USA) at ages one to four . His father graduated from University of Wisconsin-Madison. He was a professor at the Faculty of Foreign Studies (Linguistic Department) at Nagoya Gakuin University and became the president of Nagoya Gakuin University in April 2020. His mother is a piano teacher. His little brother, who is four years younger than him, is studying film production at Osaka University of Arts.

He was strongly influenced by his academic and artistic parents. He started playing piano at the age of three until Junior High School. He graduated from Toho High School, a private school, in Nagoya. After high school, Eiji majored in English at the same university, but later dropped out to move to Tokyo.  His desire to become an actor sprouted in middle school and was also influenced by the habit of his family of having a movie night once a month. At the age of 19 or 20, he went to Tokyo and auditioned for a year. The trigger that lead Eiji to drop out of university and to enter the world of entertainment was a call from the CEO of his current agency in 2014. At that time, he was still in university and he had to make the decision either to start then or after graduation at the age of 23. He made a "now or never" decision and dropped out of university to join Tristone Entertainment.

Career
He was affiliated with the Nagoya model office "FORM JAPAN" when he was in his teens. He was active as a model and talent under the name . In 2010, he joined the local idol group "BOYS AND MEN" in Nagoya, working on stage performances and regular appearances of variety shows. Eiji is said to have left "BOYS AND MEN" in 2011. Originally, he entered the entertainment agency because he wanted to be an actor and not an idol.

He won the Grand Prix at the men's model audition of Samantha Thavasa in 2013, which became the turning point for him to audition in Tokyo at the age of 19. In 2015, he transferred to his current agency Tristone Entertainment, working as an actor and starring in television dramas and films in his current stage name.

Filmography

Television

Films

Stage

Music video

Radio dramas

Advertisements

Modelling

Awards and nominations

References

Notes

Sources

External links
 

Japanese male film actors
Japanese male models
Japanese male stage actors
Japanese male television actors
Actors from Aichi Prefecture
1994 births
Living people
21st-century Japanese male actors